The Jim Brown Shield Tournament is an annually awarded interstate ice hockey championship trophy in Australia for senior men aged 17 years and older with the condition that players of the Australian Ice Hockey League that are 24 years and older must have played less than 6 games to remain eligible. The current trophy is in the form of a shield and is the third trophy to bear the Brown family name. The trophy is named after Scottish born James Archibald Brown. The Jim Brown Shield is competed for in a series of games between state representative teams in what is called The Brown Tournament.

Jim Brown Memorial Trophy Tournament

The 2015 national tournament will be held from 8 October - 11 October and will consist of 6 teams, 5 representing a state each and 1 representing a territory. The Australian territory that is competing in the tournament is Australian Capital Territory. The states competing are Victoria, New South Wales, Queensland, South Australia and the 2014 champions Western Australia.

The tournament will be held at the O'Brien Group Arena, in Docklands, Victoria.

The schedule is as follows:

Standings
The standings for the 2015 Jim Brown Memorial Tournament:

Jim Brown Shield Championship

Semi Final 1

Semi Final 2

Bronze-medal game

Gold-medal game

See also

Jim Brown Memorial Trophy
Ice Hockey Australia
Australian Capital Territory Ice Hockey Association
New South Wales Ice Hockey Association
Ice Hockey Queensland
South Australia Ice Hockey Association
Victorian Ice Hockey Association
Western Australian Ice Hockey Association
Australian Ice Hockey League
Goodall Cup
Joan McKowen Memorial Trophy

References

External links
Ice Hockey Australia website

Australian Ice Hockey League
Australian Junior Ice Hockey League
Junior ice hockey leagues
junior
Youth ice hockey